Lachlathetes is a genus of antlions in the subfamily Palparinae. Species occur in tropical Africa and Asia.

Species 
 Lachlathetes chiangi (Banks, 1941) (southern China)
 Lachlathetes contrarius (Walker, 1853) (Burma, India, Kampuchea, Sri Lanka, Vietnam)
 Lachlathetes falcatus (McLachlan, [1867]) (Burma, Kampuchea, Sri Lanka, Vietnam)
 Lachlathetes furfuraceus (Rambur, 1842) (tropical east Africa)
 Lachlathetes gigas (Dalman, 1823) (Gabon, Guinea, Sierra Leone)
 Lachlathetes moestus (Hagen, 1853) (Botswana, Mozambique, South Africa, Tanzania)

References

External links 

Myrmeleontidae genera
Insects of Asia
Myrmeleontidae